Tiņģere Manor is a manor house in Īve parish in Talsi municipality in the historical region of Courland, in western Latvia.

History 
Tiņģere Manor, which has survived to the present day, was built in 1805 by St. Petersburg banker Johann Bach. Since the end of the 19th century until the agrarian reform in 1920, the manor was a property of the Ostenzaken family. From the 1927 and until 2008 manor housed the Tiņģere elementary school. It is also used by the Ķurbe Lutheran congregation on Sundays.

Tourist attractions 
Manor interior can be seen by prior appointment which also includes theatrical tour and presentation of the history of the castle. Visitors walk through the manor's park and the Island of Love and enjoy work in the art studio and visit the cellars of the castle. Meal will be served in enjoyable the atmosphere.

See also
List of palaces and manor houses in Latvia

References

External links

  Tiņģere Manor

Manor houses in Latvia
1805 establishments in the Russian Empire
Talsi Municipality